The NCAA Basketball (formerly NCAA March Madness) series was a college basketball game which was published by EA Sports from 1998 until 2009. After EA Sports' rival publisher 2K Sports cancelled its own college basketball game, College Hoops, in 2008, EA changed the name of the series from NCAA March Madness to NCAA College Basketball. The series was discontinued on February 10, 2010.

It was released on PlayStation, PlayStation 2, Xbox, Xbox 360 and PlayStation 3.
Like other games based on NCAA sports, it could not feature the players' names (as that is against NCAA policy/rules), so only the players' numbers were used in the rosters. Users were able to edit the rosters, putting in the correct names for each team if they wished to do so. Many player last names were built into the in-game commentary, like in the NBA Live series.

Verne Lundquist, Brad Nessler, and Gus Johnson lent their voices for play-by-play in the games at various times. Lundquist was the original announcer, with Nessler taking over in the mid-2000s and Johnson joining him for the most recent game in the series. Bill Raftery and Dick Vitale were analysts. Raftery originally worked with Lundquist on their games and returned to work alongside Johnson for CBS-branded games in NCAA Basketball 10, while Vitale and Nessler joined the series at the same time.

Games

NCAA March Madness 98

NCAA March Madness 98 is the 1997 installment in the NCAA March Madness series. It was released on February 28, 1998 for the PlayStation. Former Wake Forest player and retired San Antonio Spurs player Tim Duncan the now Naismith Memorial Basketball Hall of Famer is featured on the cover.

NCAA March Madness 99

NCAA March Madness 99 is the 1998 installment in the NCAA March Madness series. It was released on December 18, 1998 for the PlayStation. Former North Carolina player Antawn Jamison is featured on the cover.

NCAA March Madness 2000

NCAA March Madness 2000 is the 1999 installment in the NCAA March Madness series. It was released in December 1999 for the PlayStation. Former Maryland player Steve Francis is featured on the cover.

NCAA March Madness 2001

NCAA March Madness 2001 is the 2000 installment in the NCAA March Madness series. It was released on December 7, 2000 for PlayStation. Former Cincinnati and NBA player Kenyon Martin is featured on the cover.

NCAA March Madness 2002

NCAA March Madness 2002 is the 2001 installment in the NCAA March Madness series. It was released on January 9, 2002 for PlayStation 2. Former Duke player and former Miami Heat player Shane Battier is featured on the cover.

NCAA March Madness 2003

NCAA March Madness 2003 is the 2002 installment in the NCAA March Madness series. It was released on November 21, 2002 for PlayStation 2. Former Kansas Jayhawks player Drew Gooden is featured on the cover. The game's cover shows deformities within the artwork.

NCAA March Madness 2004

NCAA March Madness 2004 is the 2003 installment in the NCAA March Madness series. It was released on November 17, 2003 for PlayStation 2 and Xbox. Former Syracuse player Carmelo Anthony is featured on the cover. Commentary is done by Brad Nessler and "Mr. College Basketball" Dick Vitale as he is introduced in the game. This is the first time the player can pick their favorite school and the menus are stylized in the school's colors and a cheerleader or mascot can appear on the main menu while playing the school's fight song. The game plays similar to NBA Live 2004.

NCAA March Madness 2005

NCAA March Madness 2005 is the 2004 installment in the NCAA March Madness series. It was released on November 16, 2004 for PlayStation 2 and Xbox. Former Connecticut player, Charlotte Bobcats player, New Orleans Hornets player, Washington Wizards player, and New Orleans Pelicans player and current NBA free agent player Emeka Okafor is featured on the cover.

NCAA March Madness 06

NCAA March Madness 06 is the 2005 installment in the NCAA March Madness series. It was released on October 12, 2005 for PlayStation 2 and Xbox. Former Oklahoma City Thunder player Raymond Felton is featured on the cover.

NCAA March Madness 07

NCAA March Madness 07 is the 2006 installment in the NCAA March Madness series. It was released on January 17, 2007 for PlayStation 2 and Xbox 360. Former Gonzaga player Adam Morrison is featured on the cover.

NCAA March Madness 08

NCAA March Madness 08 is the 2007 installment in the NCAA March Madness series. It was released on December 11, 2007 for PlayStation 3, PlayStation 2, and Xbox 360. Former University of Texas and current Phoenix Suns forward Kevin Durant is featured on the cover. It was the only March Madness game to debut for the PlayStation 3 until the name change.

NCAA Basketball 09

NCAA Basketball 09 is the 2008 installment in the NCAA College Basketball series. It was released on November 17, 2008 for the PlayStation 3, PlayStation 2, and Xbox 360. The cover featured former UCLA and current Miami Heat forward Kevin Love.

NCAA Basketball 10

NCAA Basketball 10 is a basketball video game developed by EA Canada and published by EA Sports. It was released November 17, 2009 on Xbox 360 and PlayStation 3. Former University of Oklahoma and current Boston Celtics forward Blake Griffin was featured on the cover.

The NCAA Basketball series was discontinued after NCAA Basketball 10.

Cover Athletes

Discontinuation of NCAA Basketball Series 
The video game series had used likenesses of college athletes, threatening their amateur statuses. The amateur rules of collegiate sports overruled any claim that the athletes had towards compensation based on the Likeness Licensing Litigation; there is a contractual agreement made when scholarships are given out to do this.

References

External links 
 Official website (archived. June 29, 2009)
 NCAA March Madness 98 at IGN 
 NCAA March Madness 99 at IGN 
 NCAA March Madness 2000 review at IGN
 NCAA March Madness 2001 review at IGN
 NCAA March Madness 2002 review at IGN
 NCAA March Madness 2003 review at IGN
 NCAA March Madness 2004 review at IGN
 NCAA March Madness 2005 review at IGN
 NCAA March Madness 06 review at IGN
 NCAA March Madness 07 at IGN 
 NCAA March Madness 08 at IGN 

College basketball video games in the United States
Electronic Arts franchises

Video game franchises introduced in 1998
Video games developed in Canada
Video games developed in the United States